Colegio Jordán de Sajonia, is a private Catholic elementary, secondary and  preparatory school located in Bogotá, D.C., Colombia. The bilingual school was founded on February 1, 1954 by Alberto E. Ariza, a Dominican Friar.

Principals 

 1954–1960: Rev. José de Jesús Sedano González, OP
 1961–1963: Rev. Luis Carlos Perea Sastoque, OP
 1964: Rev. Ismael Enrique Arévalo Claro, OP
 1965: Rev. Salvador Sánchez Toro, OP
 1966–1969: Rev. Domingo Abel Amaya, OP
 1970–1971: Rev. Adalberto Cardona Gómez, OP
 1972–1976: Rev. Jesús Antonio Ceballos Giraldo, OP
 1977–1979: Rev. Luis Carlos Perea Sastoque, OP
 1979–1982: Rev. José Antonio Balaguera Cepeda, OP
 1983–1986: Rev. Vicente Becerra Reyes, OP
 1987: Rev. Marco Antonio Peña Salinas, OP
 1987–1988: Rev. Jesús Antonio Ceballos Giraldo, OP
 1989–1991: Rev. Mauricio Galeano Rojas, OP
 1992–1993: Rev. Tiberio Polanía Ramírez, OP
 1994–1995: Rev. José Arturo Restrepo Restrepo, OP
 1995–1998: Rev. Mauricio Galeano Rojas, OP
 1998–2003: Rev. Rubén Darío López García, OP
 2003–2006: Rev. Jaime De Jesús Valencia García, OP
 2006–2007: Rev. Jaime Andrés Argüello Parra, OP
 2007–2011: Rev. Giovanni Humberto Guarnizo V, OP
 2012-2015: Rev. Oscar Guayan Perdomo, OP
 2015-2019: Rev. José Gabriel Mesa Angulo, OP
 2019-2021 : Rev. Edgar Aníbal Rueda Bueno, O.P.
 2021 : Rev. Javier Antonio Castellanos, O.P.

See also 

 Blessed Jordan of Saxony
 Dominican Order
 Saint Thomas Aquinas University

References

External links 
  Colegio Jordán de SajoniaOfficial website
  Province of Saint Louis BertrandOfficial website

Jordan de Sajonia
Jordan de Sajonia
Colegio Jordan de Sajonia
Jordan de Sajonia
Schools in Bogotá
1954 establishments in Colombia